Sweetgrass 113-M16 is an Indian reserve of the Sweetgrass First Nation in Saskatchewan. It is 7 miles west of North Battleford. In the 2016 Canadian Census, it recorded a population of 0 living in 1 of its 1 total private dwellings.

References

Indian reserves in Saskatchewan
Division No. 16, Saskatchewan